There have been three baronetcies created for persons with the surname Cowan, all in the Baronetage of the United Kingdom. All three creations are extinct.

The Cowan Baronetcy, of London, was created for Lord Mayor of London John Cowan. The title became extinct on his death in 1842.

The Cowan Baronetcy, of Beeslack in the County of Midlothian, was created in the Baronetage of the United Kingdom on 12 May 1894 for the paper manufacturer and political organiser John Cowan. The title became extinct on his death in 1900.

The Cowan Baronetcy, of the Baltic and of Bilton in the County of Warwick, was created in the Baronetage of the United Kingdom on 28 January 1921 for the naval commander Rear-Admiral Sir Walter Cowan. The title became extinct on his death in 1956.

Cowan Baronets, of London (1837)
Sir John Cowan, 1st Baronet (1774–1842)

Cowan baronets, of Beeslack (1894)
Sir John Cowan, 1st Baronet (1814–1900)

Cowan baronets, of the Baltic and Bilton (1921)
Sir Walter Henry Cowan, 1st Baronet (1871–1956)

References

Extinct baronetcies in the Baronetage of the United Kingdom